The Southern Astrophysical Research (SOAR) telescope is a modern  aperture optical and near-infrared telescope located on Cerro Pachón, Chile at  elevation. It was commissioned in 2003, and is operated by a consortium including the countries of Brazil and Chile, Michigan State University, the Cerro Tololo Inter-American Observatory (CTIO) (part of the National Optical Astronomy Observatory, NOAO), and the University of North Carolina at Chapel Hill. Partners have guaranteed shares varying from 10 to 30 percent of the observing time.

The telescope uses active optics on its primary and secondary mirrors to attain median image quality 0.7 arcsec at a wavelength of 500 nm. Multiple instruments are available on standby, mounted at unusually high weight-capacity Nasmyth foci and two lower capacity bent-Cassegrain foci. Switching is accomplished within a few minutes by rotating the 45° tertiary mirror. The pointing of this mirror is adjusted at high speed to prevent image blur from vibrations induced by wind-shake of the telescope structure.

Overview 
Its optical specifications are:
 M1 total diameter 4300mm
 Entrance Pupil Diameter	4100mm
 Pupil central Obstruction 980mm
 M1 working f/# 1.6855 (no prime focus is available)
 Focal plane working f/# 16.625
 Effective Focal Length 68176.3mm
 Gamma ratio (dZ(foc)/dZ(M2))	100.5
 Zero-Vignetting Field Diameter	14.4arcmin
 Focal Plane Radius of curvature	966.3mm
 Sag w/r to Maximum Field	10.59mm

Instruments 
Current (5/2014) instruments are:
 UV–optical 16-million pixel imager (SOI, CTIO)
 near-infrared (1–2.4 μm wavelength) 1-million pixel HgCdTe imager and spectrograph (OSIRIS, Ohio State University/CTIO)
 UV–optical 16-million pixel imager and spectrograph (Goodman Spectrograph, UNC)
 near-infrared (1–2.4 μm wavelength) 16-million pixel HgCdTe imager (SPARTAN, MSU)
 adaptive optics module (SAM, CTIO)

Additional facility instruments are being commissioned:
 UV–optical 16-million pixel integral-field spectrograph (SIFS, Brazil)

User instruments are employed by individual astronomers or teams but not available to all users.

US astronomers access the telescope remotely over the Internet 2. Chilean and Brazilian astronomers use their high-speed networks. An on-site operator controls where the telescope points while the remote astronomer controls the instrument and data retrieval.

The SOAR telescope dome is a $2 million, weatherproof structure weighing over 70 tons.

Gallery

See also 
 List of largest optical reflecting telescopes
 List of observatories

References

External links 
 SOAR home site
 Brazil SOAR pages
 MSU SOAR pages
 UNC SOAR pages
 Case History - Structural Adequacy of the Dome
 Coordinates for Observatories on Cerro Tololo and Cerro Pachon

Optical telescopes
Michigan State University
University of North Carolina at Chapel Hill
Astronomical observatories in Chile
Buildings and structures in Coquimbo Region
2003 establishments in Chile
NOIRLab